See also :Category:Memorials, cenotaph, monument, catacombs, cemetery, pyramid, list of Cemeteries, list of mausoleums, list of Memorials, list of pyramid mausoleums in North America.

This is a list of tombs and mausoleums that are either notable in themselves, or contain the remains of a notable person/people.  Tombs are organized by the person buried in them, sorted according to origin of the person.

Major figures in African history

Egyptian figures

Songhai figures

Ugandan figures

Major figures in Asian history

Chinese figures

Indian figures

Japanese figures

Korean figures

Mongolian figures

Myanmar figures

Pakistani figures

Vietnamese figures

Other

Major figures in European history

Albanian figures

British figures

Bulgarian and Ancient Thracian figures

French figures

Italian figures

Russian figures

Major figures in Middle-Eastern history

Persian/Iranian figures

Turkish figures

Major figures in North American history

Mesoamerican figures

Figures from the United States of America

Major religious figures

Judeo-Christian figures

Baháʼí figures

Muslim figures

See also

 Tomb of the Unknown Soldier – about the concept, lists specific tombs by country
 List of papal tombs

References

Mausoleums and tombs